Keoka Lake is a small lake in the town of Waterford, Oxford County, Maine, United States. It is south of Waterford Flat and northeast of Waterford City (South Waterford). It is notable for being adjacent to the birthplace of Artemis Ward. It was formed by glaciers retreating and advancing along with Mount Tire'm, an adjacent mountain.

External links 

Lakes of Oxford County, Maine
Lakes of Maine